Real Fábrica del Buen Retiro (popularly called La China; "Buen Retiro Porcelain Factory"; alternatively, Real Fábrica de Porcelana del Buen Retiro) was a porcelain manufacturing factory in Spain. It was located in Madrid's Parque del Buen Retiro, Madrid on a site near the Fuente del Ángel Caído.

The factory began by moving the Capodimonte porcelain factory from Naples in 1760, after its founder there had inherited the Spanish throne as Carlos III of Spain. He took the equipment and about 40 key workers, including Giuseppe Gricci (c. 1700–1770), the main modeller, and nearly five tons of porcelain paste.  Since the paste, the main artists, and the fleur-de-lys factory mark, were all used by both factories, distinguishing between their products from the years around the move can be very difficult.  The factory continued to make soft paste porcelain until 1803, when it switched to hard-paste porcelain; some pieces made were in fact creamware, an English style of fine earthenware. 

The factory concentrated on figurines, especially of classical subjects, but also made tablewares and decorative vessels such as vases and pots.  Porcelain rooms were installed at three royal palaces. Initially Gricci's style remained similar to the elegant Rococo of his Naples works, but soon the newly-fashionable Neoclassicism became dominant, which remained the case throughout the life of the factory.

After the disruptions of the Napoleonic Wars, in 1817 the factory moved a short distance across Madrid to become the Royal Factory of La Moncloa, again taking such moulds and equipment as survived, and the employees.  This operated until 1849.

Porcelain rooms

Gricci had made a chinoiserie porcelain room, the Porcelain boudoir of Maria Amalia of Saxony, at the Palace of Portici near Naples (now moved to the Palace of Capodimonte), and was soon asked to make another one at the Palace of Aranjuez, which he made and installed between 1763 and 1765, at a cost of 571,555 Spanish reales.  The factory made another room, rather smaller and in a Neoclassical style, for the main Palacio Real, Madrid. This was designed by Carlo Schepers in the 1770s, and cost 256,958 reales.  Both these had walls largely of plain white plaques, over which lay a network of coloured elements in a medium to high relief, made up of plant motifs and figures.

The room at the small Casita del Principe, El Escorial was again Neoclassical, but with a very different appearance. The walls were almost entirely covered by 234 plaques in the style and technique of Wedgwood's jasperware, with a "Wedgwood blue" ground and the design in white biscuit porcelain in low relief. These were applied as sprigs, meaning that they made separately as thin pieces, and stuck to the main blue body before firing.  The plaques are framed like paintings; they were made between 1790 and 1795.

History

1700s
The factory was founded in 1760 on a site in the Buen Retiro park which at that time was the private gardens of a royal palace on the outskirts of Madrid. It was an initiative of Carlos III of Spain, who succeeded to the Spanish throne in 1759, and his wife, Maria Amalia of Saxony.
 
Prior to becoming King of Spain, Charles reigned as King of Naples and Sicily.  A similar factory, the Porcellana di Capodimonte, had been established by the royal couple in Naples.  Maria Amalia died in 1760, a year after moving to Madrid with her husband, but she was an important influence on both the Naples and the Madrid factories.  53 specialized Italian craftsmen from Naples came to Madrid, along with three shipments containing the necessary equipment and special paste, to establish a factory to produce royal porcelain in Madrid. Gaetano Schepers was in charge of the factory and ten Spanish artists were also associated with the manufacturing. The porcelain's quality was internationally recognized, and its manufacturing techniques were kept a state secret.  Buen Retiro porcelain was one of the products that drove mercantilist royal policy during the Spanish Age of Enlightenment.  There were other factories in the Madrid area producing luxuries such as tapestries, glass etc.

1800s

The year 1803 marked a transition in the factory management from the Italian board of directors to the Spanish-born Bartolome Sureda y Miserol. During his career, Sureda directed several royal factories, including the Real Fábrica de Paños in Guadalajara, the Real Fábrica de Loza de la Moncloa, and the Real Fábrica de Cristales de La Granja.

The occupying French forces were driven out of Madrid in 1812, during the Peninsular War, and the park became the scene of intense fighting. The factory building was fortified by the French, and attacked by the British. 
Wellington, who was threatened with a counter-offensive, gave orders to burn the building and the factory ceased production. It has been suggested that the decision to destroy the factory was influenced by commercial rivalry as well as its strategic importance.

In 1817, the factory was re-established on a new site in Madrid, becoming the Royal Factory of La Moncloa, founded by Ferdinand VII, who moved the Buen Retiro workshops and warehouses to La Moncloa. Sureda became director again in 1821. All of the employees of the destroyed factory were re-employed in the new one.

Collections
Apart from the porcelain rooms, covered above, a fine collection of porcelain from the factory is on display in the Museo de Historia de Madrid.  The Museo Nacional de Artes Decorativas has a display, and some pieces are shown in the Museo del Prado.  Several other European and American museums display pieces.

Gallery

See also
 Real Fábrica de Cristales de La Granja
 Royal Tapestry Factory

Notes

References
Battie, David, ed., Sotheby's Concise Encyclopedia of Porcelain, 1990, Conran Octopus. 
Le Corbellier, Clare, Eighteenth-century Italian porcelain, 1985, Metropolitan Museum of Art, (fully available online as PDF)

External links
 Porcelana del Buen Retiro at Centro Virtual Cervantes, Instituto Cervantes (in Spanish)

Ceramics manufacturers of Spain
Companies established in 1760
Manufacturing companies based in Madrid
Defunct manufacturing companies of Spain
Demolished buildings and structures in Madrid
Buildings and structures in Spain demolished during the Peninsular War